Mineral resource estimation is used to determine and define the ore tonnage and grade of a geological deposit, from the developed block model. There are different estimation methods used for different scenarios dependent upon the ore boundaries, geological deposit geometry, grade variability and the amount of time and money available. A typical resource estimation involves the construction of a geological and resource model with data from various sources. Depending on the nature of the information and whether the data is hard copy or computerized, the principal steps of computer resource estimation are:
 Creation, standardization and validation of the database.
 Section plotting and interactive geological modeling.
 Geostatistical analysis.
 Block modeling and block estimation.

Geological modelling 
An orebody model serves as the geological basis of all resource estimation, an orebody modeling project starts with a critical review of existing drill hole and surface or underground sample data as well as maps and plans with current geological interpretation. Drill hole and/or sample databases are set up to suit all the quantitative and qualitative information necessary to build a resource model. The creation of a geological model may include the following steps:
 Computer-based 3D orebody modeling
 Sectional, longitudinal, 3D and multi-seam modeling
 Geostatistical analysis, variographic analysis of composite spatial continuity

Block model estimation 
Once the geological modeling is completed, the geological envelopes are divided into block models. Subsequently, the estimation of these blocks is done from "composites" that are point measures of the grade of ore in the rock. Several different mathematical methods can be used to do the estimation depending on the desired degree of precision, quality and quantity of data and of their nature.

Nearest neighbor method 
The nearest neighbor method assigns grade values to blocks from the nearest sample point to the block. Closest sample gets a weight of one; all others get a weight of zero. In two dimensions, this method generates a Voronoi diagram composed of polygons each with a unique grade; in three dimensions this method generates a Voronoi diagram composed of polyhedra each with a unique grade.

In mathematics, a Voronoi diagram is a partitioning of a plane into regions based on distance to points in a specific subset of the plane. That set of points (called seeds, sites, or generators) is specified beforehand, and for each seed there is a corresponding region consisting of all points closer to that seed than to any other. These regions are called Voronoi cells. The Voronoi diagram of a set of points is dual to its Delaunay triangulation. Put simply, it's a diagram created by taking pairs of points that are close together and drawing a line that is equidistant between them and perpendicular to the line connecting them. That is, all points on the lines in the diagram are equidistant to the nearest two (or more) source points.

Advantages

Easy to understand
Easy to calculate manually
Easy to use as a repeatable standard
When automated, reasonably fast in 2D

Disadvantages

Local discontinuities are unrealistic
Produces biased estimates of grade and tonnage above an ore waste cut-off. Which is called the volume variance relationship i.e. the variability of the grade distribution depends on the volume of samples. Large volume samples mean small variability whereas small volume samples mean large variability.

Inverse distance weighting method 
The name "inverse distance weighting method" was motivated by the weighted average applied, since it resorts to the inverse of the distance to each known point ("amount of proximity") when assigning weights.

The simplest weighting function in common usage is based upon the inverse of the distance of the sample from the point to be estimated, usually raised to the second power, although higher or lower powers may be useful.

Samples closer to the point of interest get a higher weighting than samples farther away. Samples closer to the point of estimation are more likely to be similar in grade. Such inverse distance techniques introduce issues such as sample search and declustering decisions, and cater for the estimation of blocks of a defined size, in addition to point estimates.

Advantages

Computationally simple
Exponent gives flexibility. The same estimation procedure can be used to create very smooth estimates (like a moving average) or very variable estimates (like nearest neighbor)

Disadvantages

Preferential sampling makes estimates unreliable
Requires decision on which sample to use
Extremes create large halos of great estimates
Choice of exponent introduces arbitrariness

Kriging 
In statistics, originally in geostatistics, Kriging or Gaussian process regression is a method of interpolation for which the interpolated values are modeled by a Gaussian process governed by prior covariances, as opposed to a piecewise-polynomial spline chosen to optimize smoothness of the fitted values.  Under suitable assumptions on the priors, Kriging gives the best linear unbiased prediction of the intermediate values.  Interpolating methods based on other criteria such as smoothness need not yield the most likely intermediate values. The method is widely used in the domain of spatial analysis and computer experiments. The technique is also known as Wiener–Kolmogorov prediction, after Norbert Wiener and Andrey Kolmogorov.

The theoretical basis for the method was developed by the French mathematician Georges Matheron based on the Master's thesis of Danie G. Krige, the pioneering plotter of distance-weighted average gold grades at the Witwatersrand reef complex in South Africa. Krige sought to estimate the most likely distribution of gold based on samples from a few boreholes.  The English verb is to krige and the most common noun is Kriging; both are often pronounced with a hard "g", following the pronunciation of the name "Krige".

Advantages
Very good in local and global estimates.
Geological knowledge is captured in variogram.
Statistical approach allows uncertainty to be quantified.

Disadvantages
Not easy to comprehend.
Computationally intensive: hardware, software.
Flexibility and power created by many parameters also create arbitrariness and more possibilities for error.

Resource block model 
The block model is created using geostatistics and the geological data gathered through drilling of the prospective ore zone. The block model is essentially a set of specifically sized "blocks" in the shape of the mineralized orebody. Although the blocks all have the same size, the characteristics of each block differ. The grade, density, rock type and confidence are all unique to each block within the entire block model. An example of a block model is shown on the right. Once the block model has been developed and analyzed, it is used to determine the ore resources and reserves (with project economics considerations) of the mineralized orebody. Mineral resources and reserves can be further classified depending on their geological confidence.

Mineral resources
A mineral resource can be explained as a concentration or occurrence of diamonds, natural solid inorganic material, or natural solid fossilized organic material including base and precious metals, coal, and industrial minerals in or on the Earth’s crust in such form and quantity and of such a grade or quality that it has reasonable prospects for economic extraction. The location, quantity, grade, geological characteristics and continuity of a mineral resource are known, estimated or interpreted from specific geological evidence and knowledge.

Inferred Mineral Resource

An inferred mineral resource is that part of a Mineral Resource for which quantity and grade or quality can be estimated on the basis of geological evidence and limited sampling and reasonably assumed, but not verified, geological and grade continuity. The estimate is based on limited information and sampling gathered through appropriate techniques from locations such as outcrops, trenches, pits, workings and drill holes.

Indicated Mineral Resource

An indicated mineral resource is that part of a Mineral Resource for which quantity, grade or quality, densities, shape and physical characteristics, can be estimated with a level of confidence sufficient to allow the appropriate application of technical and economic parameters, to support mine planning and evaluation of the economic viability of the deposit. The estimate is based on detailed and reliable exploration and testing information gathered through appropriate techniques from locations such as outcrops, trenches, pits, workings and drill holes that are spaced closely enough for geological and grade continuity to be reasonably assumed.

Measured Mineral Resource

A measured mineral resource is that part of a Mineral Resource for which quantity, grade or quality, densities, shape, and physical characteristics are so well established that they can be estimated with confidence sufficient to allow the appropriate application of technical and economic parameters, to support production planning and evaluation of the economic viability of the deposit. The estimate is based on detailed and reliable exploration, sampling and testing information gathered through appropriate techniques from locations such as outcrops, trenches, pits, workings and drill holes that are spaced closely enough to confirm both geological and grade continuity.

Mineral reserves
A Mineral Reserve is the economically mineable part of a Measured or Indicated Mineral Resource demonstrated by at least a Preliminary Feasibility Study. This Study must include adequate information on mining, processing, metallurgical, economic and other relevant factors that demonstrate, at the time of reporting, that economic extraction can be justified. A Mineral Reserve includes diluting materials and allowances for losses that may occur when the material is mined.

Probable Mineral Reserve

A probable mineral reserve is the economically mineable part of an Indicated and, in some circumstances, a Measured Mineral Resource demonstrated by at least a Preliminary Feasibility Study. This Study must include adequate information on mining, processing, metallurgical, economic, and other relevant factors that demonstrate, at the time of reporting, that economic extraction can be justified.

Proven Mineral Reserve

A proven mineral reserve is the economically mineable part of a Measured Mineral Resource demonstrated by at least a Preliminary Feasibility Study. This Study must include adequate information on mining, processing, metallurgical, economic, and other relevant factors that demonstrate, at the time of reporting, that economic extraction is justified.

Case history 
When the Bre-X Minerals ltd. scandal was revealed in the spring of 1997, it was one of the largest core salting scams in history and galvanised the development of the NI 43–101 reporting standards. While not the first (Tapin Copper salted samples in the 1970s), it is one of the most popular and the catalyst for reporting reform.

Bre-X
Bre-X was a group of companies in Canada.  A major part of the group, Bre-X Minerals Ltd. based in Calgary, was involved in a major gold mining scandal when it reported it was sitting on an enormous gold deposit at Busang, Indonesia (in Borneo). Bre-X bought the Busang site in March 1993 and in October 1995 announced significant amounts of gold had been discovered, sending its stock price soaring. Originally a penny stock, its stock price reached a peak at CAD $286.50 (split adjusted) in May 1996 on the Toronto Stock Exchange (TSE), with a total capitalization of over CAD $6 billion. Bre-X Minerals collapsed in 1997 after the gold samples were found to be a fraud.

Emergence of reporting standards

Plainly put, the purpose of the National Instrument 43-101 is to ensure that misleading, erroneous or fraudulent information relating to mineral properties is not published and promoted to investors on the stock exchanges overseen by the Canadian Securities Authority.

The NI 43–101 was created after the Bre-X scandal to protect investors from unsubstantiated mineral project disclosures.

"The gold reserves at (Bre-X's) Busang were alleged to be 200 million ounces (6,200 t), or up to 8% of the entire world's gold reserves at that time. However, it was a massive fraud and there was no gold. The core samples had been faked by salting them with outside gold. An independent lab later claimed that the faking had been poorly done, including the use of shavings from gold jewelry. In 1997, Bre-X collapsed and its shares became worthless in one of the biggest stock scandals in Canadian history."

The promulgation of a codified reporting scheme makes it more difficult for fraud to occur and reassures investors that the projects have been assessed in a scientific and professional manner. However, even properly and professionally investigated mineral deposits are not necessarily economic, nor does the presence of a NI 43-101-, JORC- or SAMREC and SAMVAL-compliant CPR or QPR necessarily mean that it is a good investment.

Similarly, the publication of a complex technical report with all the inherent jargon, technical wording and abstract geological, metallurgical and economic information may not actually significantly advantage an investor who is not able to fully nor properly understand the content or importance of this information. In this way the NI 43–101 may not serve the interests of those it is designed to protect— the retail investors who may easily misinterpret such information.

Two main regulatory documents exist depending on the national jurisdiction the company is filed with. In Canada, the National Instrument 43-101 report details requirements of reporting mineralized findings. In Australia, the Joint Ore Reserves Committee Code (JORC Code), and South Africa mandates the South African Code for the Reporting of Mineral Resources and Mineral Reserves (SAMREC). All 3 codes are similar but not identical on requirements, definitions, and terminology. Regardless of the technicalities of each document, all exist to:

Set criteria for approval of assay labs and methods 
Regulate ways of making sure samples are not tampered with 
Ensure periodic, independent reporting of reserves and review and approval of reserve reports 
Standardize for the disclosure of assay and drill results and procedures so that all data is clear to investors 
Standardize definitions of reserve types and reserve calculations 
Assign accountability to an individual deemed to be a competent person/ professional in the industry

The establishment and subsequent revisions of the NI 43 101 document by the Ontario Securities Commission provides a framework to adhere to when writing the report. By establishing these standards, investors are able to have a more reliable and honest review of potential mineralized zones.

See also
 United Nations Framework Classification for Resources

References 

Economic geology
Mineral economics
Geology software
Management cybernetics